Isanapura, also known as Sambhupura or Sambor of St'ung Sen, was the capital of the ancient kingdom of Chenla. It is located in what is now Kampong Thom Province in Cambodia. The city was founded in about 618 at Leek Sambor Kuk by King Isanavarman I.

Today, the site of old Isanapura contains the ruins of 150 temples and buildings, which are a few centuries older than that of the Khmer Empire around Angkor Wat. During the Vietnam War, some of these temples were completely destroyed by US bombers. Further damage was done by vandals, dealers in old relics, and the Khmer Rouge. Many temples have been overgrown by the jungle.

Archaeology
Archaeologists divide the temples, all of which are dedicated to the god Shiva, into four groups: the Northern Group, the Small Group Z, the Central Group and the Southern Group. Of these groups, the Southern Group is the best preserved. Eight octagonal towers and several gates are still standing. In the outer walls of these towers are machined brick panels, two meters high, some badly damaged. The main temple of this group, Prasat Neak Poan, has several relief operations that were formerly plastered. The Central Group still contains a standing tower, Prasat Tao (King Lion Temple). Two stone lions (originally there were four, but two were stolen), are at the main entrance of the brick tower. The Northern Group includes nine temples and a large tower, Prasat Sambo. This group was heavily damaged by bombing. The carved sandstone columns and door frames testify to the art of the Chenla empire.

References

Archaeological sites in Cambodia
618 establishments
Buildings and structures in Kampong Thom province
Chenla